Lucien Rudaux (1874–1947) was a French artist and astronomer, who created famous paintings of space themes in the 1920s and 1930s.

The Rudaux crater on Mars and the Lucien Rudaux Memorial Award are named in his honor.  The asteroid 3574 Rudaux is also named for him.

Biography 

Lucien Rudaux was the son of the painter Edmond Rudaux, and grandfather by marriage of the French physicist Francis Rocard.

In 1892, he joined the  Société astronomique de France. In 1894, he founded an observatory in Donville. In 1895–1896, he completed his military service at Granville.

From 1903, he was a science writer and artist for Nature and, from 1905, for L'Illustration.

He was in military service from August 1914 in the 79th Territorial Infantry Regiment. In 1915 he joined the 10th nursing section until 1917.

In 1936, he lived in 113 Boulevard Saint-Michel in Paris.

In 1912 he was appointed an Officer of Public Instruction. He was a member of the Astronomical Society of France and the National Meteorological Office. In 1936, he was awarded a knighthood (Chevalier) in the Legion of Honour.

Astronomical activities 

He was the director of a small observatory, Donville-les-Bains in Normandy, and contributed to the establishment of the  "Astronomy" in the "Palais de la découverte".

Books

L. Rudaux, G. Vancouleurs; Astronomy (1962)

Publications in French 

, illustrated by Lucien Rudaux.
 (later editions 1952, with collaborator Gérard de Vaucouleurs)
 (later edition. 1990)

 (later editions. 1952, 1956)

Notes and references

 http://iaaa.org/gallery/rudaux/
 http://www.fabiofeminofantascience.org/PAUL/PAUL2.html

1874 births
1947 deaths
Space artists
20th-century French astronomers
19th-century French painters
French male painters
20th-century French painters
20th-century French male artists
19th-century French astronomers
19th-century French male artists